James Duff Brown (1862–1914) was a British librarian, information theorist, music biographer and educationalist. Most of his life was spent in London.

Biography

He was born in Edinburgh, but after beginning his library career in Glasgow, he subsequently moved to London, and worked in Clerkenwell for the Metropolitan Borough of Finsbury.  He devised three classification systems: Quinn/Brown (1898), Adjustable classification (1898) and Subject Classification (1906).  The latter system was for municipal libraries and was informed by his advocacy of open shelf access of books in the UK.  Indeed, he was [t]he pioneer of this new system [while he was librarian] of Clerkenwell, where the first experiment in open access was launched in May, 1893. This was referred to as "safe guarded open access".  Alongside his classification work, he produced a standard textbook on librarianship (the Manual of Library Economy).  In 1898 he was threatened with a libel action by Charles Goss, over a polemic  defending open access, and he was forced to apologise. He further contributed to theoretical journals and also produced correspondence courses in librarianship "upon which most British librarians depended for their professional studies until the 1930s".  As Librarian in the Metropolitan Borough of Islington he largely built up their collection and service.

Ideas

His work in classification attempted to deal with the problem of the shelf arrangement of interdisciplinary works, and how to ensure that works on the same topic would be found in the same place.  Part of his attempt to deal with this was to create synthesised notation (a rarity among classification systems in his day) to allow composite classmarks to be created.

Clare Beghtol notes He tried to bring all works on a concrete topic together notationally so that, for example, "at E917 for Coffee must be collected everything related to coffee, regardless of standpoint, form or other qualification but it must not be put under such headings as Tropical Agriculture, Beverages, Crops, Foods, Drugs, Ethics, Bibliography, Customs, or any other general head."

Publications
1886: Biographical Dictionary of Musicians
1893: Guide to the Formation of a Music Library
1897: British Musical Biography with Stephen Samuel Stratton
1898: Manual of Library Classification and Shelf Arrangement
1903: Manual of Library Economy (7 later eds.)
1906: Manual of Practical Bibliography
1906: Subject Classification (1st ed. 1906 ; 2nd ed. 1914 ; 3rd ed. (rev. by J. D. Stewart) 1939)
1907: The Small Library: a guide to the collection and care of books
1910: Characteristic Songs and Dances of All Ages
1912: Library Classification and Cataloguing

References

External links

1862 births
1914 deaths
Scottish librarians
Scottish bibliographers
Curators from Edinburgh
Scottish biographers
British information theorists